Johnson v Railway Express Agency, Inc 421 US 454 (1975) is a US labor law case, concerning discrimination.

Facts
Willie Johnson claimed that his employer, the Railway Express Agency, Inc in Memphis, Tennessee discriminated against him in seniority and job assignments. He filed with the EEOC a charge that the employer was discriminating against its Negro employees over seniority rules and job assignments. He also charged the labor unions, Brotherhood of Railway Clerks Tri-State Local and Brotherhood of Railway Clerks Lily of the Valley Local, were racially segregating memberships. Three weeks later he was fired, so Johnson added a claim of unlawful discriminatory termination. The EEOC issued reports around 2 years later favoring Johnson's complaint, but after this the District Court in Tennessee rejected the claim for being over the 1 year limit in its Statute of Limitations.

Judgment
Blackmun J held that he was out of time, although it conceded that the old Enforcement Act of 1870 provided a remedy against private parties. He said the following:

Marshall J (Douglas J and Brennan J concurring) dissented with the following:

See also

US labor law

United States labor case law